Brunislav "Bruno" Pavelić (4 March 1937 – 28 September 2021), was a Serbian basketball player.

Playing career 
Pavelić grew up playing basketball with KK Lokomotiva Zemun. Also, he occasionally played football in FK Jedinstvo Zemun with Vladica Popović. Eventually, under the influence of coach Miomir Lilić he decided to go further with basketball. In 1954, he joined newly established club Mladost Zemun. In 1956, he moved to KK Proleter Kreka where he played for two seasons before he went to serve compulsory military service in the Yugoslav People's Army.

Pavelić played for OKK Beograd under Bora Stanković and Aleksandar Nikolić during the 1960s. At the time, his teammates were Radivoj Korać, Slobodan Gordić, Miodrag Nikolić, and Trajko Rajković among others. He won three Yugoslav League championships and two Yugoslav Cups. Afterwards, he returned to Mladost Zemun where he played until retirement in 1974.

Post-playing career 
While playing for OKK Beograd, Pavelić also worked at the Industry of Machinery and Tractors (IMT). Between 1969 and 1973, he was a technical director at the Novi Beograd Sports Hall. In 1973, he was named a technical director at the Pinki Hall where he worked until his retirement in 2001.

Personal life 
His father was a recipient of the Commemorative Medal of the Partisans of 1941. Pavelić is not related to Ante Pavelić, Croatian fascist politician and dictator.

Career achievements 
 Yugoslav League champion: 3 (with OKK Beograd: 1960, 1963, 1964).
 Yugoslav Cup winner: 2 (with OKK Beograd: 1960, 1962)

References

External links 
 Sportski spomenar: Bruno Pavelić (RTS)

1937 births
2021 deaths
Basketball players from Belgrade
Guards (basketball)
KK Mladost Zemun players
OKK Beograd players
Serbian expatriate basketball people in Bosnia and Herzegovina
Serbian men's basketball players
Yugoslav men's basketball players